Schermer is a former municipality in the Netherlands, in the province of North Holland. The name came from "skir mere", which means "bright lake" (ref. Groenedijk, 2000). Since 2015 it has been a part of Alkmaar.

The municipality of Schermer included not only the Schermer polder, but also the polders Oterleek, Mijzenpolder, and Eilandspolder.

History 
Around 800 AD, the area that was the municipality of Schermer was covered in peat, and a small river called the Schermer flowed through it. Because of peat-digging by man, and storm floods, this small river had by 1250 developed into an inland lake with an open connection with the Zuyderzee. In the 17th century private investors started draining the largest part of the lake, leaving the southern part, the Alkmaardermeer, intact. In 1635,  of polder was drained, whereupon the land was divided among the shareholders. In 1970, the village of Zuid- en Noord-Schermer was merged into Schermer.

Population centres 
The municipality of Schermer consisted of the following cities, towns, villages and/or districts: Driehuizen, Grootschermer, Oterleek, Schermerhorn, Stompetoren, Zuidschermer. The latter two are located in the Schermer polder.

Topography

Dutch Topographic map of the municipality of Schermer, 2013.

Local government 

The municipal council of Schermer consisted of eleven seats, which were divided as follows:

 CDA - 3 seats
 Gemeentebelangen - 3 seats
 SGOL - 2 seats
 VVD - 2 seats
 PvdA - 1 seat

References

External links

Official website

Alkmaar
Polders of North Holland
Former municipalities of North Holland
Municipalities of the Netherlands disestablished in 2015